The Welsh Rugby Union Division Three North is a rugby union league in Wales.

Competition format and sponsorship

Competition
There are 12 clubs in the WRU Division Three North. During the course of a season (which lasts from September to May) each club plays the others twice, once at their home ground and once at that of their opponents for a total of 18 games for each club, with a total of 90 games in each season. Teams receive four points for a win and two point for a draw, an additional bonus point is awarded to either team if they score four tries or more in a single match. No points are awarded for a loss though the losing team can gain a bonus point for finishing the match within seven points of the winning team. Teams are ranked by total points, then the number of tries scored and then points difference. At the end of each season, the club with the most points is crowned as champion. If points are equal the tries scored then points difference determines the winner. The team who is declared champion at the end of the season is eligible for promotion to WRU Division Two North.

Sponsorship 

In 2008 the Welsh Rugby Union announced a new sponsorship deal for the club rugby leagues with SWALEC. The sponsorship is a three-year deal that will continue until the 2010/11 season at a cost of £1 million (GBP). The leagues sponsored are the WRU Divisions one through to six.

 (2002–2005) Lloyds TSB
 (2005–2008) Asda
 (2008–2011) SWALEC

2012/2013 season

League teams

 Bangor RFC
 Bennllech RFC
 Flint RFC
 Harlech RFC
 Holyhead RFC
 Menai Bridge RFC
 Newtown RFC
 Porthmadog RFC
 Rhosllanerchrugg RFC
 Welshpool RFC
 Wrexham RFC

2012/2013 Table

2011/2012 season

League teams
 Bangor RFC
 Benllech RFC
 Caer Borderers RFC WITHDRAWN
 Flint RFC
 Harlech RFC
 Holyhead RFC
 Llangoed RFC WITHDRAWN
 Llangollen RFC
 Menai Bridge RFC
 Rhosllanerchrugog RFC
 Shotten Steel RFC
 Welshpool RFC

2011/2012 Table

2010/2011 season 

 Benllech RFC
 Flint RFC
 Harlech RFC
 Holyhead RFC
 Llangoed RFC
 Llangollen RFC
 Menai Bridge RFC
 Rhosllanerchrugog RFC
 Shotten Steel RFC

References

Rugby union leagues in Wales